Sesel may refer to:

 Seychelles, an Indian Ocean island state 
 Sesel Zvidzai, Zimbabwean politician